The Marjum Formation is a Cambrian geological formation that overlies the Wheeler Shale in the House Range, Utah.  It is known for its occasional preservation of soft-bodied tissue, and is slightly younger than the Burgess Shale, falling in the Ptychagnostus praecurrens trilobite zone.

References 

Cambrian geology of Utah
Cambrian southern paleotropical deposits